Kasethan Kadavulada is a 1972 Indian Tamil-language caper comedy film written and directed by Chitralaya Gopu. The film stars Muthuraman and Lakshmi, with M. R. R. Vasu, Thengai Srinivasan, Srikanth, Moorthy, Manorama, Rama Prabha and Jayakumari in supporting roles. It focuses on a young man (Muthuraman) collaborating with his cousin (Sreekanth) and friend (Srinivasan) to steal money from his stingy stepmother (Manorama).

Kasethan Kadavulada, based on Gopu's play of the same name is the directorial debut of Gopu, and was produced by AVM Productions. Muthuraman and Moorthy reprise their roles from the play. The music was composed by M. S. Viswanathan, cinematography was handled by K. S. Bhaskar, and editing by R. G. Gopu.

Kasethan Kadavulada was released on 19 May 1972. The film became a commercial success, with Srinivasan's role as a fake godman becoming immensely popular. A remake with the same name is scheduled to release in 2023.

Plot 
Lakshmi, a domineering woman, controls all her husband Sivaswamy's money, treating him with scorn and disdain. Ramu and his cousin Mali hatch a plot with their tea vendor friend Appaswamy, who pretends to be a godman named Badrinath Swamy Sukranada to get to her money safe and steal a sum of 50,000. Meanwhile, Rama is an orphan whose only friend is Iruthayam, the doctor of a mental institution. When Rama wants a conduct certificate, Iruthayam bungles and hands over the certificate of an insane girl also named Rama.

DSP Paramantham, who previously arrested Appaswamy, comes to see the godman. Appaswamy tells Paramantham to not handle any cases at this time. An incident occurs when Rama encounters Appaswamy without a beard, but to his surprise she does not recognise the difference. The house receives a telegram saying that the real Badrinath Swamy Sukranada is arriving in two days, meaning Appaswamy has to loot his sum within that time frame. Lakshmi's brother Mani wants to buy jewellery for his girlfriend, Latha, and needs money after being exposed by his girlfriend's brother. Mani steals Appaswamy's money 5,001 that he received as a donation from Lakshmi (the extra 1 came from Chettiar), but Rama catches him red-handed.

The sane Rama arrives at Lakshmi's house to work as a secretary. Lakshmi sees the certificate, but decides to keep her at her house since the certificate mentions that Rama becomes violent when somebody refuses to give her what she wants. Rama falls in love with Ramu. The insane Rama and her father also come there to work coincidentally. More complications arise (the insane Rama's father overhears Ramu and Appaswamy's heist plan and subsequently the insane Rama lets her anger out on Appaswamy, leading to a deal in which Ramu and Appaswamy will not tell anybody that the sane Rama is insane as nobody knows and that the insane Rama's father will not tell anybody about the heist plan), leading to more incidents.

Lakshmi tells Appaswamy about the cash she has stashed in her secret hideout, and shows him how to access it. Appaswamy and Ramu succeed in their heist later that night, but are exposed after they place the cash in a flower pot. The insane Rama's father, the sane Rama, and Mani all encounter the cash. Mani throws it outside to his Latha's brother. Again, Rama catches him red-handed. The cash is in Latha's brothers' coat. To prove that the other Rama is truly insane, the sane Rama tells the insane Rama that the coat will look good on her. When Latha's brother refuses to give her his coat, the insane Rama shows her insanity. As a result, all problems are solved, Lakshmi is pacified, and agrees to Ramu and the sane Rama's marriage.

Cast 

 Actors
 Muthuraman as Ramu
 M. R. R. Vasu as the insane Rama's father
 Thengai Srinivasan as Appaswamy
 Srikanth as Mali
 Moorthy as Sivaswamy
 Typist Gopu as Dr. Iruthayam
 Sasikumar as Mani
 Senthamarai as DSP Paramantham (guest appearance)
 Suruli Rajan as Chettiar (guest appearance)
 S. Rama Rao as Iyer
 S. L. Narayanan as Dr. Iruthayam's secretary
 Sundhar as Mugilan

Actresses
 Lakshmi as the secretary Rama
 Manorama as Lakshmi
 Rama Prabha as the insane Rama
 Jayakumari as Latha
 Kumari Sachu as a popular dancer (guest appearance)
 Vijayarekha as Appaswamy's wife
 Renuka Sheshathri as Prema

Production 

Kasethan Kadavulada was a play written and directed by Chitralaya Gopu, and staged over 300 times. AVM Productions founder A. V. Meiyappan who saw the play decided to adapt it into a feature film and insisted Gopu direct; Gopu initially refused the directorial offer and wanted C. V. Rajendran to direct the film. The film adaptation marked Gopu's directorial debut. While Muthuraman and Moorthy reprised their roles from the play as son and father, Manorama, who portrayed the lead actor's love interest in the play, portrayed the matriarch in the film; the lead actor's love interest in the film was instead portrayed by Lakshmi. Thengai Srinivasan portrayed the tea vendor Appaswamy masquerading as a godman, reprising the role originally played by Ramani, a mimicry artist, though many thought Nagesh would be cast in that role. In portraying Appaswamy, Srinivasan spoke in Madras Bashai. Cinematography was handled by K. S. Bhaskar, and editing by R. G. Gopu.

Soundtrack 
The music was composed by M. S. Viswanathan, with lyrics by Vaali. The song "Jambulingame" became popular upon release. Elements of the song were borrowed by Thaman S and used in "Pudhu Punal" from Mouna Guru (2011).

Release and reception 
Kasethan Kadavulada was released on 19 May 1972. Gopu recalled that producers put up a huge cut-out for Srinivasan in the saint get-up. Srinivasan who was pleased did not want the lead actor Muthuraman to misunderstand so he and Gopu went to Muthuraman and explained that it was the role that became popular and even apologised to Muthuraman who smiled it away. This cutout created controversy when a journalist wrote that Srinivasan's look from the film resembled religious singer Pithukuli Murugadas, which led Murugadas to call Gopu and express his dissatisfaction, but Gopu promised him to watch the film; he watched and was impressed with it. The film was a commercial success, and Gopu received more film offers to work as both director and writer. Randor Guy of The Hindu attributed the success to "the excellent comedy sequences, humorous dialogue, fine direction of Chitralaya Gopu and excellent performances". Thirumalai titled his 2011 comedy film as Kasethan Kadavulada which had no similarity with this film.

Other versions 
In 2017, Y. G. Mahendran organised a play based on the film that was staged in Mylapore. Mahendran reprised the role of Srinivasan from the film. The play was performed 100 times. The film was remade in Tamil under the same title by R. Kannan, and is scheduled to release on 10 February 2023.

Home media 
Kasethan Kadavulada was made available for viewing on Amazon Prime Video when it was launched in India in December 2016.

References

External links 
 
 

1970s heist films
1970s Tamil-language films
1972 comedy films
1972 directorial debut films
1972 films
AVM Productions films
Films about mental health
Films directed by Chitralaya Gopu
Films scored by M. S. Viswanathan
Indian comedy films
Indian films based on plays
Indian heist films